Benthomangelia antonia is a species of sea snail, a marine gastropod mollusk in the family Mangeliidae.

Description
The length of the shell varies between 8 mm and 15 mm.

(Original description) The shell is six-whorled, with a length of 5.75 mm. The protoconch is clear brown, with three whorls, on most of which there are scalar ridges which are much more closely and regularly set than in Benthomangelia bandella, and do not resemble lamellae. There is only a trace of an antesutural revolving rib in the earlier whorls which vanishes entirely in the later ones, and with it, of course, the tendency to raised points of sculpture. Though its place is marked by a white opacity in the otherwise rather translucent shell. There are thirteen longitudinal ribs on the body whorl, which extend on to the anterior fourth of the whorl instead of vanishing, and are more evident and sharper where they cross the band. While the revolving ribs are less regular and extend partially over the notch-band, which is thus rendered much less conspicuous than in B. bandella. The notch is also less marked and the spire has a stouter aspect.

Distribution
This species occurs in European waters, the Northwest Atlantic Ocean (from New Jersey, USA, to Southern Brazil), off the Azores in the Gulf of Guinea and in the Gulf of Mexico.

References

 Gofas, S.; Le Renard, J.; Bouchet, P. (2001). Mollusca, in: Costello, M.J. et al. (Ed.) (2001). European register of marine species: a check-list of the marine species in Europe and a bibliography of guides to their identification. Collection Patrimoines Naturels, 50: pp. 180–213
 Rosenberg, G., F. Moretzsohn, and E. F. García. 2009. Gastropoda (Mollusca) of the Gulf of Mexico, pp. 579–699 in Felder, D.L. and D.K. Camp (eds.), Gulf of Mexico–Origins, Waters, and Biota. Biodiversity. Texas A&M Press, College Station, Texas

External links
  Tucker, J.K. 2004 Catalog of recent and fossil turrids (Mollusca: Gastropoda). Zootaxa 682:1-1295.
 
 MNHN, Paris: syntype

antonia
Gastropods described in 1881